Willem Frederik "Wim" van Eekelen (born 5 February 1931) is a retired Dutch politician, diplomat, and political scientist.

Early life and education

Van Eekelen attended a Gymnasium in Utrecht from June 1943 until June 1949 and applied at the Utrecht University in June 1949 majoring in Law and obtaining a Bachelor of Laws degree in July 1951. Van Eekelen attended Princeton University and graduated in 1952 with an A.B. in politics after completing a senior thesis titled "The Marshall Plan and Its Significance for the Netherlands." Van Eekelen graduated with an Master of Laws degree from the University of Utrecht in November 1954. Van Eekelen was conscripted in the Royal Netherlands Army serving in the cavalry Regiment Huzaren van Boreel as a Lieutenant from July 1956 until August 1957. Van Eekelen worked as a civil servant for the Ministry of Foreign Affairs from September 1957 until June 1977 for the Diplomatic service from September 1957 until May 1974 as an Attaché in New Delhi, India from September 1957 until January 1960 in London, England from January 1960 until February 1964. Van Eekelen later returned to the Utrecht University in February 1964 for another postgraduate education where he worked as a researcher and got an doctorate as an Doctor of Philosophy in Political science on 18 November 1964.

Career

Van Eekelen worked as Attaché in Accra, Ghana from November 1964 until October 1966 and as a senior attaché for the Permanent Representative of the Netherlands to the European Union from October 1966 until May 1971 and as a Consul for the European Economic Community from May 1971 until August 1974. Van Eekelen worked as Director-General for the department of Atlantic Cooperation and Security Affairs of the Ministry of Foreign Affairs from August 1974 until June 1977.

Van Eekelen was elected as a Member of the House of Representatives after the election of 1977, taking office on 8 June 1977. Following the cabinet formation of 1977 Van Eekelen was appointed as State Secretary for Defence in the Cabinet Van Agt–Wiegel, taking office on 20 January 1978. After the election of 1981 Van Eekelen returned as a Member of the House of Representatives, taking office on 25 August 1981. The Cabinet Van Agt–Wiegel was replaced by the Cabinet Van Agt II following the cabinet formation of 1981 on 11 September 1981. After the election of 1982 Van Eekelen was appointed State Secretary for Foreign Affairs in the Cabinet Lubbers I, taking office on 5 November 1982. After the election of 1986 Van Eekelen once again returned as a Member of the House of Representatives, taking office on 3 June 1986. Following the cabinet formation of 1986 Van Eekelen was appointed as Minister of Defence in the Cabinet Lubbers II, taking office on 14 July 1986. On 6 September 1988 Van Eekelen resigned following the conclusions of a parliamentary inquiry report into a passport fraud investigation that was mishandled by him during the time he serves as State Secretary for Foreign Affairs in the previous cabinet, his successor as State Secretary for Foreign Affairs René van der Linden subsequently resigned on 9 September 1988.

Van Eekelen remained active in national politics, in April 1989 he was nominated as Secretary General of the Western European Union, serving from 15 May 1989 until 15 November 1994. Van Eekelen was elected as a Member of the Senate after the Senate election of 1995, taking office on 13 June 1995 serving as a frontbencher chairing several parliamentary committees. In January 2003 Van Eekelen announced his retirement from national politics and that he wouldn't stand for the Senate election of 2003 and continued to serve until the end of the parliamentary term on 10 June 2003.

After retirement
Van Eekelen retired after spending 26 years in national politics and became active in the private sector and public sector and occupied numerous seats as a corporate director and nonprofit director on several boards of directors and supervisory boards (Institute for Multiparty Democracy, Achmea, Netherlands Atlantic Association, Transnational Institute, Carnegie Foundation and the Institute of International Relations Clingendael) and served as an diplomat and lobbyist for several economic delegations on behalf of the government and as an advocate and lobbyist for Democracy, NATO and European integration.

Van Eekelen is known for his abilities as a negotiator and consensus builder.

Decorations

References

External links

Official
  Dr. W.F. (Wim) van Eekelen Parlement & Politiek
  Dr. W.F. van Eekelen (VVD) Eerste Kamer der Staten-Generaal

 
 

 
 

 
 

1931 births
Living people
Commanders of the Order of the Netherlands Lion
Commanders of the Order of Merit of the Republic of Poland
Commanders of the Order of the Star of Romania
Dutch corporate directors
Dutch democracy activists
Dutch expatriates in Belgium
Dutch expatriates in England
Dutch expatriates in India
Dutch expatriates in Ghana
Dutch expatriates in the United States
Dutch lobbyists
Dutch nonprofit directors
Dutch nonprofit executives
Dutch officials of the European Union
Dutch political consultants
Dutch political scientists
European Union lobbyists
Foreign policy writers
Geopoliticians
Grand Crosses with Star and Sash of the Order of Merit of the Federal Republic of Germany
Grand Officiers of the Légion d'honneur
Grand Officers of the Order of Orange-Nassau
Grand Officers of the Order of Leopold II
Members of the House of Representatives (Netherlands)
Members of the Senate (Netherlands)
Ministers of Defence of the Netherlands
Politicians from Utrecht (city)
People's Party for Freedom and Democracy politicians
Political realists
Princeton University alumni
Royal Netherlands Army officers
State Secretaries for Defence of the Netherlands
State Secretaries for Foreign Affairs of the Netherlands
Utrecht University alumni
Academic staff of Utrecht University
Western European Union people
20th-century Dutch civil servants
20th-century Dutch diplomats
20th-century Dutch jurists
20th-century Dutch male writers
20th-century Dutch politicians
21st-century Dutch civil servants
21st-century Dutch diplomats
21st-century Dutch male writers
21st-century Dutch politicians